Brittain, Ohio was a small settlement, part of the township of Springfield east of Akron, which has now been completely integrated into Akron. It was settled by the John T. Brittain Family in 1832.(A house built by the family ca. 1874 still stands on Brittain Road). Brittain was located at the crossroads of roads from Tallmadge (north), Mogadore (east), North Springfield (south) and Middlebury (west). It is 1,066 feet above sea level.

The Little Cuyahoga River ran through Brittain and was joined by Springfield lake Outlet Creek on its outskirts. Brittain was possibly a settlement area for indigenous Americans.

Among other early settlers was Benjamin Hilbish, who farmed wheat from 1849, raised a family and built a home in 1869.

The village was locally referred to as the ‘white grocery' owing to several grocers and clean streets.

Sheriff Alanson Lane in 1892 described Brittain: "Brittain (formerly for many years known as "White Grocery"), one mile east of the city limits, on the Mogadore road, has had a hotel or two, store, post office, school house, wagon shop, blacksmith shop, clay-mill, etc., with private residences to correspond."

Brittain had a one-room school house, a post office, a Methodist church, hotels, clay mill, blacksmith, and a grist mill. The Roegers family had a carriage manufacturing workshop. A sawmill at Oak Hill was situated on the Little Cuyahoga River.

As Akron absorbed Middlebury to the west, and then spread into Brittain, several parts were lost to urban sprawl. After World War II the interstate highway project constructed a highway over most of what was left of Brittain.

Brittain Road in Akron is named after the village. Most of what was once the Village of Brittain is at the current intersections of East Market and Mogadore Road in Akron, in the Ellet school cluster.

References

External links 
 
 

Geography of Akron, Ohio